Kingdom Greyhound Stadium is a greyhound racing track located in Tralee, County Kerry, Ireland.  It has been known as Oakview Park and the Tralee Greyhound Stadium previously.

Racing takes place every Tuesday, Friday and Saturday evening and the facilities include a grandstand restaurant, fast food facilities, a number of bars, totalisator betting and seating. It also has a large car park around the stadium.

Race distances are 500, 525, 550, 570, and 750 yards and the feature competitions at the track are the Juvenile Classic and the Race of Champions.

History
A track known as the Ardfert Greyhound track in Ardfert opened in August 1929 but unfortunately closed the same year as a result of a larger track arriving in Oakview Village nearer to the Tralee town centre. The first meeting was held on 9 April 1930 at Oakview Park and the circumference was 476 yards making for a nice comfortable course for the greyhounds. 

The great Ballyhennessy Seal made his debut here in 1943 followed by Spanish Battleship, Ballymac Ball, Priceless Border and Patricias Hope, a quite remarkable list of greyhounds that graced the track over the years. In addition a series of competitions have been introduced over the years providing the Tralee public with regular annual events. The events were the Bloom 500, Harp Lager Stakes, Rose of Tralee, Clarke Cup, Kingdom Puppy Cup, Monalee
Hiker Stakes and the MJ Hannafin Memorial Cup. The last mentioned event the MJ Hannafin Memorial Cup was named in memory of the Racing Manager at the track when it opened in 1930. His brothers to Jerry and Dennis Hannafin were two highly respected trainers in the industry.  

MJ Hannafin was Racing Manager until 1950 and then the hot seat was taken up by Kevin Laide for over thirty years before John Ward took over.

Recent events
At the turn of the century many Irish tracks received a boost from Greyhound Racing Ireland with refurbishment on the agenda. Tralee was no exception and underwent a major refit with the stadium redesigned for the new Millennium under the ownership of the Board.

Two new competitions the Juvenile Classic and Race of Champions have been introduced and they have quickly established themselves as leading feature events in the Irish racing calendar despite the fact that they have only been inaugurated in recent years. The stadium underwent further upgrading in 2012 following extra investment by Greyhound Racing Ireland.

Competitions
Juvenile Classic
Race of Champions

Track records

Current track records

Former track records

References

Greyhound racing venues in the Republic of Ireland
Sport in County Kerry
Sports venues in County Kerry
Sport in Tralee